Language is the debut studio album by South Korean hip hop duo XXX. It was released on November 28, 2018, by Beasts And Natives Alike.

The album's artwork is the removal of lipstick and letters from their previous ep Kyomi.

Track listing
All lyrics written by Kim Ximya; all tracks produced by Frnk.

References

2018 debut albums
XXX (music group) albums
Korean-language albums